Tom Squitieri (born August 25, 1953) is an American journalist, public speaker, and public relations specialist. Since January 2018, he has been the Pentagon correspondent for Red Snow News.

Squitieri was an award-winning reporter with USA Today. After the September 11, 2001 attacks, he reported from the Pentagon  as well as Iraq, Uzbekistan,  Turkey and Italy. Other experience included presidential and congressional campaigns in 2000  and 1996, Capitol Hill, various Bill Clinton and political scandals, crime, drugs, arms smuggling and lead reporting on breaking news stories. Foreign assignments include an array of conflicts around the world, including the 1989 Panama invasion, Haiti (1991–1997), Northern Ireland, 1991 Gulf War (Iran, Iraq, Turkey), Moldova (1992), former Yugoslavia (1992–1996), Burundi and Rwanda  (1993–1994), Central Asia and Afghanistan  (2001–2003), Iraq  (2003–2004).

Squitieri was forced to resign from USA Today  in May 2005 after a dispute over attribution of quotes he reported in a story revealing Pentagon failures to properly up-armor vehicles in Iraq.

Since leaving USA Today, Squitieri has written columns for the Foreign Policy Association, The Hill, and U.S. News & World Report. He also was an adjunct professor at Washington and Jefferson College and at American University.

Squitieri wrote three articles for the Huffington Post in 2011 that were later deleted for "not adequately disclos[ing] a material conflict of interest." Salon claimed he had obfuscated his employment with Qorvis Communications, a company that is registered as a pro-Bahrain lobbyist in the US. Each article contained this reader's note: "Tom Squitieri is a journalist and is also working with the Bahrain government on media awareness."

References

External links

1953 births
Living people
American war correspondents
War correspondents of the Iraq War
War correspondents of the War in Afghanistan (2001–2021)
Foreign correspondents in Africa
American broadcast news analysts
Washington & Jefferson College alumni
American political journalists